Balé is one of the 45 provinces of Burkina Faso, located in its Boucle du Mouhoun Region with Boromo as capital. The province is known for its Deux Balé Forest, populated by savannah elephant herds. Boromo, the provincial capital, is located on the main road from Ouagadougou to Bobo-Dioulasso.
In June 2007, the Canadian mining company, Semafo, open the third gold mine in the country in Mana in the province, with an investment of about $116 million.

History
On November 15, 2008 a bus accident killed 69 people at Boromo.  when a passenger bus transporting workers to Côte d'Ivoire collided with a commercial truck. Both vehicles burst into flames.

Geography
The province is known for its Deux Balé Forest, populated by savannah elephant herds. Boromo, the provincial capital, is located on the main road from Ouagadougou to Bobo-Dioulasso, and serves as a gateway to the park.

Demographics
Most people in the province live in rural areas; 277,165 live in the countryside with only 20,202 people residing in urban areas. There are 147,993 men living in Balé Province and 149,374 women.

Departments
Bale is divided into 10 departments:

Economy and services
In June 2007, the Canadian mining company, Semafo, open the third gold mine in the country in Mana, with an investment of about $116 million. There is a hydroelectric station at Boromo, operated by the Société Nationale d'électricité du Burkina Faso (SONABEL) with 1,269 MWh.

In 2011 the province had 164 primary schools and 22 secondary schools.

In 2011 the province had 31 health and social promotion centers (Centres de santé et de promotion sociale), 4 doctors and 115 nurses.

See also
 Regions of Burkina Faso
 Provinces of Burkina Faso
 Communes of Burkina Faso

References 

 
Provinces of Burkina Faso